The Kamboja-Pala dynasty ruled parts of Bengal in the 10th to 11th centuries CE, after invading the Palas during the reign of Gopala II. The last Kamboja Kamboh ruler of the Kamboja-Pala Dynasty Dharmapala was defeated by the south Indian Emperor Rajendra Chola I of the Chola dynasty in the 11th century.

Origins

During the last centuries BCE, many clans of the Kambojas entered India in alliance with the Sakas, Pahlavas, Yavanas and spread into Sindhu, Saurashtra, Malwa, Rajasthan, Punjab and Surasena. An offshoot of the Meerut Kamboh's moved eastwards and entered the Pala domains and in the 10th century, conquering north-west Bengal. Kamboja tribes were employed by the Palas following Devapala's conquests due to the lack of native cavalry in Bengal

Ancient sources on Kamboja Rule in Bengal
There are several ancient inscriptions which attest Kamboja rule in Bengal. The most important sources are:

Dinajpore Pillar Inscription
The Dinajpur Pillar Inscription records to a Kamboja king called the Kambojanvaya Gaudapati (i.e. lord of Gauda).. The Pillar Inscription was originally established in a Siva temple that was built by the king but removed to Bangar, about 40 miles east of Gauda, during the period of Muslim rule. During the 18th century, the Pillar was further moved to Dinajpore by Maharaja Ram Nath and as a result, the inscription came to be known as Dinajpore Pillar Inscription. The Dinajpore Pillar Inscription dates to the second half of the 10th century.

Irda Copper Plate (Tamrapatra)
The Irda Copper plate (Irda Tamarapatra) is another source on the Kamboja-Pala dynasty and was discovered in 1931. It is written in Sanskrit and has 49 lines of text in ancient Bengali script.  The Vamsa or the tribal identity of the rulers mentioned in the Irda Copper Plate is specifically stated to be Kamboja-Vamsha-Tilaka (i.e. Ornament of the Kamboja family or Glory of the Kamboja tribe).  Like the Dinajpore Pillar Inscriptions, the Irda Copper plate is also thought to belong to the second half of tenth century (Dr N. G. Majumdar, Dr R. C. Majumdar).  Hence the academic community believes that the Kambojanvaya Gaudapati of Dinajpore Pillar Inscriptions and the Kambojavamshatilaka Paramasaugata Maharajadhiraja parameshvara paramabhattaraka Rajyapala of Kamboja-Pala dynasty of Irda Copper Plate Inscriptions refers to the same Kamboja family.  But whereas the Dinajpur Pillar inscriptions refer just to one Kamboja ruler with the appellation of "Kambojanvaya Gaudapati", the Irda Copper plate, mentions generation after generation of the Kamboja-Pala kings of Bengal i.e. Rajyapala, Narayanapala and Nayapala etc.  The Kamboja-Pala kings of the Irda Copper plate had ruled north-west Bengal in the tenth or eleventh century.

Bangar Grant of Mahipala I

Bangar Charter of Mahipala I is the third very important ancient source of Kamboja rule in Bengal. The charter asserts that Mahipala had re-conquered nearly the whole of north and east Bengal "after defeating the usurpers who had seized his ancestral kingdom". The same verse has been repeated in the Aamgaachhi Charter of Vigrahapala-3. But "Who were the usurpers the inscription does not tell, but other evidences indicate that the rulers belonging to the Kamboja family were in possession of the north and west Bengal". Scholars believe that Mahipala's Charter alludes to the seizing of the northern parts of Bengal by Kamboja dynasty from the Gopala II or Vigrahapala II of the Pala dynasty, which the great king Mahipala I claims to have won back by the force of his arms

Extent of Kamboja Empire
No definite information is available on the precise geographical area of the Kamboja-Pala kingdom of Bengal. According to Irda Copper plate evidence, the Kamboja-Pala kingdom definitely comprised Varadhmana-Bhukti Mandala (modern Burdman division) and Dandabhukti Mandala within the Kamboja empire. The Dandabhukti division is believed to have comprised southern and south-western parts of Midnapore district as well as the lower parts of river Suvaranrekha in district Balasore. Evidence from Dinajpore Pillar Inscription attests that the Gauda country also formed parts of Kamboja-Pala kingdom. But as long as we do not include northern Ladha (Radha or W. Bengal) in Kamboja-Pala empire, the region does not constitute one viable political entity. Hence it appears likely that northern parts of Radha may also formed parts of Kamboja-Pala kingdom. Dr R. C. Majumdar says that Gauda and Radha both formed parts of Kamboja-Pala empire During second half of the 10th century, the Chandela ruler Yashovarman invaded the Pala kingdom. Vakpati, a courtier-poet, claims that he conquered Gauda and Mithila. It is also stated that Chandela chief Dhanga of Jejabhukti, the successor of Yashovarman, had invaded Radha towards the end of the 10th century. As a consequence, the Kamboja power in the north Bengal received a severe jolt. This political scenario enabled the Pala king Mahipala I to re-conquer Gauda from the Kambojas. The last king of the Kambojas was Dharamapala who continued to rule Dandabhukti in the first quarter of the 11th century. The Kamboja ruler Dharamapala of Dandabhukti was defeated by the south Indian Emperor Rajendra Chola I who invaded Bengal and Bihar in the 11th century. The Capital of the Kamboja Pala kingdom is stated to be Pryangu which has not been identified yet, though some scholars tend to identify the same with an old village known as Pingvani located in Garvet Thana.

Known Kamboja kings of Bengal
We know the names of three Kamboja rulers of the Kamboja Pala family for sure viz. Rajyapala, Narayanapala and Nayapala. The Charter (Copper Plate Inscription) was issued by Kamboja king Nayapala wherein he and his father are given the imperial titles like Parameshevara, Paramabhattacharya and Maharajadhiraja. The Copper Plate Inscription also attests that the founder of the Kamboja Pala dynasty was king Rajyapala. He has been referred to as  Kambojavamshatilaka Paramasaugata Maharajadhiraja parameshvara paramabhattAraka-Rajyapala. This proves that this line of kings belonged to the Kamboja lineage. The second king is Narayanapala who was son of Rajayapala. Narayanapala was succeeded by his younger brother Nayapala, the author of the Irda Copper plate. Dr R. C. Majumdar states that the expression Kunjarghatavarshan of the Dinajpore Pillar Inscription indicates that Kunjarghatavarshan was personal name of Kambojanvaya Gaudapati of the Dinajpore Pillar Inscription. If this is so, then this Kambojanvaya Gaudapati is the fourth known Kamboja king of Kamboja dynasty of Bengal. Some scholars however believe that the Kambojanvaya Gaudapati of the Dinajpore Pillar Inscriptions is same as Kambojavamshatilaka Rajyapala of the Irda Copper plate. This does not seem to be true since Rajyapala of the Irda Copper plate is described as devotee of Buddha (Parama-saugata) whereas Kambojanvaya Gaudapati of Dinajpore Pillar Inscriptions claims in his own inscription to be a Siva devotee. It may however be possible that Kambojanvaya Gaudapati is same as Kamboja king Nayapala of the Irda Copper plate since king Nayapala also claims to be a Saivite (Siva devotee) in the Irda Copper plate. The last known ruler of the Kamboja Pala dynasty is stated to be king Dharamapala who ruled in Dandabhukti in first quarter of the 11th century.

Religion of Kamboja rulers of Bengal
The Kambojanvaya Gaudapati of Dinajpore Pillar Inscriptions is stated to be a builder of Siva temple and therefore was devotee of Siva. He is said to be a great bestower of the charities. Kambojavamsatilaka Rajayapala, the first king of the Irda Copper plate is referred to as Parama-saugata (devotee of Buddha). The third ruler Narayanapala Kamboja is stated to be a devotee of god Vishnu. King Nayapala Kamboja, the author of Irda Copper plate is known to have practised Siva cult. There is no information on the Kamboja ruler Dharamapala, but it appears likely that he may have also been a Vedic follower i.e. either Saivite or a Vishnu devotee. The Irda Copper plate has references to Hindu gods, high rising temple buildings as well as to the sacred smokes rising from the Yagya fires into the skies. This again alludes to the Hinduism of the Pala Kambojas. Irda Copper plate also makes special references to the Purohits, Kritivajyas, Dharmagyas and other holy officials. Thus we find that the Kamboja kings of Bengal were mostly Vedic Hindus, of course, with the exception of king Rajyapala. Mention is made of grants of lands and villages to the Purohits in the Burdwan district of east Bengal. According to Prof R. C. Majumdar: "More significant, however, is the inclusion of Purohits in the land grants of the Kamboja, Varman and Sena kings of Bengal. It indicates the great importance was attached to religious and social aspects of administration during rules of these dynasties which were all followers of orthodox Hinduism." Dr B. N. Sen says that the Buddhism which had followers in the early Pala and Candra rulers was probably on the decline in Bengal during the 10th century. On the other hand, the Vedic religion was on the rise. Since the Kamboja Pala kings of Bengal were mostly Vedic Hindus, hence they must have got full support from their subject which must have helped them raise a powerful empire in Bengal.

Kambojas in caste system of Bengal

In the ancient caste classification in Bengal, there are references to people who came as invaders from northwest or accompanied the invaders. These people have been described as Mlechchas in the brahmanical Caste System in Bengal. Ancient Sanskrit and Pali texts and inscriptions profusely attest the Kambojas as a tribe of Uttarapatha or Udichya division belonging to Indo-Iranian or Scytho-Aryan and not to the Mongolian stock. The north-westerners including the Kambojas, Sakas, Hunas, Yavanas, Abhiras, Khasas, Sabaras, Turushkas, Suhmas etc. have all been labelled as outsiders or foreigners within the Bengali society and therefore were left outside the ritual Caste Classification of ancient Bengal. 
Compare also: Part-II: VI. Ancient peoples of Bengal: .

Evidence on later Kamboja rulers in Bengal
There is a literary evidence which attests one Kamboja king known as Jagan Nath ruling in Bengal as late as the 16th century. King Jagan Nath is stated to have patronised a Brahmana scholar Sura Mishra who had composed Jagannathaprakasa, a Smriti Granth in honour of this Kamboja king:

Adesh.Kambojakula.vatansah Shri Jagana Natha iti parsidhah
Akaryad dharmanibandhmaytam dhradhipaiapayairkablai nreshe
This shows that the Kamboja rule in some parts of Bengal must have continued, as late as the 16th century.

See also
Gopala
Dharmapala
Khmer Empire
Middle Kingdoms of India

References

External links
 
 
 
 

 

Kambojas
Dynasties of Bengal